Villa Maria is a subsidized private Catholic co-educational high school in Montreal, Quebec, Canada. It was founded in 1854 and offers both a francophone and an anglophone stream.

There are roughly 950 students in the French sector and 800 students in the English sector with an average class size of 34 students. Current tuition as of the 2021–2022 school year is $4,500 with $1,900 in extra mandatory fees.

Formerly a girls' school, it was open, beginning August 2016, to boys in the seventh grade. Between 2016 and 2020, the integration of boys was gradual, with current girls-only classes staying girls-only. This change was speculated to be a means of boosting enrolment, due to decreased numbers of eligible students entering the anglophone stream.

The central part of the Villa Maria school is known as the Monklands Mansion and was the home of the Governor General of Canada from 1844 to 1849.  It is a National Historic Site of Canada.

Monklands
In 1795, James Monk, Chief Justice of Lower Canada, purchased an estate in Montreal that had previously belonged to the Décarie family. The first Monk residence, built in 1803, was the central section of the present-day Villa Maria.

Sir James Monk willed the property known as ‘Monklands’ to his niece, Elizabeth Ann Monk. In 1844, the family leased Monklands to the Crown as a residence for the Governor General of Canada. Modifications were made to create a more imposing residence.

Three Governors General—Sir Charles Metcalfe, Lord Cathcart, and Lord Elgin—resided at Monklands. When Elgin occupied the house, British extremists threatened to burn the structure down after Elgin signed a bill that helped those of the French whose homes had been burnt down during British raids by granting them money to reestablish themselves. However, because Lady Elgin was pregnant at the time, the rebels decided to burn down the parliament building in Montreal, instead. Soon, Lady Elgin gave birth to a son, Victor Bruce, the future Viceroy of India, in a second floor room. When the capital of the Province of Canada moved from Montreal, Monklands was turned into a country hotel that operated for five years.

Monklands is one of the oldest remaining Palladian-style villas in Canada. Because of its excellent state of conservation and the historic importance of its various occupants, it was declared a National Historic Site in 1951.

School
The third phase of the building’s history began in 1854 when the Congregation of Notre Dame of Montreal purchased the estate to open a boarding school. They called it Villa Maria.  Although some people believe the name is Latin for Ville Marie, which was Montreal's original name when first settled, it actually translates to "House of Mary". The school stopped boarding students in 1966 and now is a high school for childen in Montreal and surrounding areas from the ages 12–17 (or Levels 1 to 5 according to Quebec Education levels - equivalent of Grades 7 to 11).

Villa-Maria metro station is named after the school.

Notable students 
 Pauline Fréchette (1889–1943; graduated, 1908), poet, dramatist, journalist, nun
 Veronica Lake, American actress
 Maybelle Stephens Mitchell, American suffragist
 Jessica Pare, actress
 Anna T. Sadlier (1854–1932), writer

References

External links
 Villa Maria's home page

Catholic secondary schools in Quebec
Government Houses in Canada
High schools in Montreal
Côte-des-Neiges–Notre-Dame-de-Grâce